Weisberg, a variant of Weissberg, is a German surname. It derives from Weiss or Weiß (German for "white") and Berg (German for "mountain"). People with the surname include:

 Arthur Weisberg, (born 1931), American instrumentalist and composer
 Charles Weisberg, American forger
 Jacob Weisberg (born 1964), American political journalist 
 Lois Weisberg, Commissioner of Cultural Affairs for Chicago
 Michael Weisberg (born 1976), American philosopher and professor 
 Richard H. Weisberg, law professor
 Robert Weisberg, American lawyer and law professor
 Steve Weisberg (born 1963), American recording artist and composer
 Tim Weisberg (born 1943), American musical artist

See also 
Lauren Weisberger (born 1977), American author
Shatzi Weisberger (1930-2022), American activist and retired nurse

Ashkenazi surnames
German toponymic surnames